Alburnus escherichii, also known as the Sakarya bleak or Caucasian bleak, is a species of ray-finned fish in the genus Alburnus. It is native to the Sakarya River drainage in Turkey, and has been introduced into Lake Beyşehir and the Manavgat River.

References

escherichii
Endemic fauna of Turkey
Fish described in 1897